Robeen is a parish in County Mayo, Ireland with a church (Our Lady of Sorrows), school (Robeen National School), crèche (Robeen Rascals) and pub (Trenches). Although the parish has a parochial house and priest based there, the parish priest is based in the neighbouring parish of Roundfort.  There are also some bed and breakfasts and holiday homes in the parish.  Aside from these, farming is the main provider within the parish for those who do not work in neighbouring towns and cities such as Ballinrobe, Claremorris, Castlebar and Galway and further afield.

Geography 
Robeen is located approximately three miles west of Hollymount and five miles north of Ballinrobe.  The River Robe runs through the parish and Lough Carra is located two miles to the west beside the townland of Brownstown.  The parish also has views of the Partry Mountains and Croagh Patrick.

Nota 
 Emmet Stagg is a Labour Party TD for the Kildare North constituency.  
 Frank Noone played for Mayo Senior GAA football team during the 1990s.

See also 
Roman Catholic Archdiocese of Tuam

References 

Religion in County Mayo